Scott Jordan is the name of:
 Scott Jordan (footballer) (born 1975), English footballer; played for York City and Scarborough
 Scott Jordan (baseball) (born 1963), Major League Baseball player for the Georgia Tech Yellow Jackets and the Cleveland Indians
 Scott Jordan, founder of the American clothing company Scottevest